Piatt is a surname. Notable people with the surname include:

People
Adam Piatt (born 1976), American professional baseball outfielder
Abram S. Piatt (1821–1908), Union general in the American Civil War
Donn Piatt (1819-1891), American journalist and writer
John James Piatt (1835–1917), American poet
Sarah Morgan Bryan Piatt (1836–1919), American poet
Wiley Piatt (1874–1946), American professional baseball pitcher
Wendy Piatt (born 1976), British director

People with middle name
 A. Piatt Andrew (1873–1936), American economist and politician

Places

United States
Piatt Township, Pennsylvania
Piatt County, Illinois
Piatt's Landing, Kentucky
Piatt Castles, Logan County, Ohio
Piatt Park, Cincinnati, Ohio
https://www.monroecountyohio.com/departments/parks_and_recreation/piatt_park.php, Monroe County, Ohio

See also
Piat (disambiguation)